Geir Halnes (born 21 April 1976) is a Norwegian poet.

His debut collection Hils hvis du ser meg issued on Oktober (2007) was reviewed in VG, Adresseavisen, Dagbladet and Aftenposten. His sophomore Mor rom (Oktober, 2017) was reviewed in Dag og Tid.

At the time of releasing his first poetry collection, he was a research fellow at the Swedish University of Agricultural Sciences, later being hired at the Norwegian University of Life Sciences.

References

External links
Researchgate

1976 births
Living people
Norwegian poets
Swedish University of Agricultural Sciences alumni
Academic staff of the Norwegian University of Life Sciences
Norwegian expatriates in Sweden